The following Union Army and Confederate States Army units and commanders fought in the Battle of Big Bethel on June 10, 1861 during the American Civil War.

Abbreviations used

Military rank
 MG = Major General
 BG = Brigadier General
 Col = Colonel
 Ltc = Lieutenant Colonel
 Maj = Major
 Cpt = Captain
 Lt = Lieutenant

Other
 (w) = wounded
 (mw) = mortally wounded
 (k) = killed in action
 (c) = captured

Confederate forces
Col John B. Magruder, Commander of the Hampton Division (1404 men)

 Acting Quartermaster: William R. Vaughan
 Acting Commissary: Robert H. Vaughan
 Volunteer Aide-de-camp: George A. Magruder, jr.
 Volunteer Aide-de-camp: Hugh Stannard

Union forces
MG Benjamin Butler, Commander of the Department of Virginia (4400 men)

 Military Secretary: Maj Richard S. Fay
 Volunteer Aide-de-camp: Maj Theodore Winthrop (k)

Notes

References
 Quarstein, John V. Big Bethel: The First Battle. North Charleston, SC: The History Press, 2011. . Retrieved June 11, 2014.
 U.S. War Department. The War of the Rebellion: a Compilation of the Official Records of the Union and Confederate Armies. Washington, DC: U.S. Government Printing Office, 1880. Series I, Volume 2 [S# 2], Chapter IX.

American Civil War orders of battle